Pierre Bayonne (born 11 June 1949) is a retired Haitian footballer. Bayonne, formerly a member of Violette Athletic Club, competed with the Haiti national football team at the 1974 FIFA World Cup.

References

1949 births
Living people
Haitian footballers
Haiti international footballers
1974 FIFA World Cup players
Violette AC players
Ligue Haïtienne players
CONCACAF Championship-winning players
Association football defenders